Franciscus "Cas" Janssens (born 3 August 1944) is a former Dutch football player who played as a forward.

In 1973, he shared the first place on the list of top scorers with 18 goals together with Willy Brokamp.

External links

1944 births
Living people
Footballers from Tilburg
Association football forwards
Dutch footballers
Dutch expatriate footballers
Expatriate footballers in France
Dutch expatriate sportspeople in France
Expatriate footballers in Belgium
Dutch expatriate sportspeople in Belgium
Belgian Pro League players
Eredivisie players
Ligue 1 players
FC Wageningen players
NEC Nijmegen players
Nîmes Olympique players
R. Olympic Charleroi Châtelet Farciennes players
FC Groningen players
US Nœux-les-Mines players
20th-century Dutch people